Maquira sclerophylla is a timber tree and psychoactive plant native to tropical South America.

References

Moraceae
Flora of South America